The Geißkopf is a mountain, in the  Bavarian Forest in Germany.

Location 
The Geißkopf lies near the village of Bischofsmais in the Breitenau, a region to which Breitenauriegel, Dreitannenriegel and Einödriegel also belong.

Tourism 
The mountain has been managed since the 1960s as a local recreation area. As well as walking, there is a 1,142-metre-long chair lift which was opened in 1967/68, 3 long and 3 short drag lifts with 9 pistes as well as a sommerrodelbahn and winter toboggan runs. In the summer mountain bikes may be transported on the chair lift and there are 12 descents in the bike park. At the summit is a mountain restaurant and a 23-metre-high wooden observation tower, which enables a good, all-round view of the Rear Bavarian Forest. There is also a transmission antenna for broadcasting the radio programmes of "Unser Radio Regen" on 89.3 MHz with a transmit power of 200 W ERP. It is thus one of the few wooden towers that broadcasts radio programmes today.

A few hundred metres from the top is the Oberbreitenau, a formerly settled clearance. Today it is home to the Landshuter Haus, managed by the Bavarian Forest Club.

Gallery

References

External links 

 Region Geißkopf

Mountains of Bavaria
Mountains of the Bavarian Forest
One-thousanders of Germany
Regen (district)